Eucalyptus ceratocorys, also known as the horn-capped mallee, is a mallee that is native to South Australia and Western Australia. It has rough, ribbony bark at the base of its trunk, smooth greyish bark above, lance-shaped adult leaves, flower buds in groups of seven or nine with ridges along the sides, white to cream-coloured flowers and cylindrical fruit.

Description
It has rough flaky bark near the base of the trunks and shaggy, ribbony bark above that does not shed cleanly. Flowering occurs between July and December and the flowers are white to cream coloured, rarely red.

Taxonomy and naming
The horn-capped mallee was first formally described in 1934 by William Blakely who gave it the name Eucalyptus angulosa var. ceratocorys from a specimen collected near Comet Vale. Blakely published the description in his book A key to the Eucalypts. In 1988, Lawrie Johnson and Ken Hill raised the variety to species status as Eucalyptus ceratocorys. The specific epithet (ceratocorys) is derived from the Ancient Greek words keras meaning "horn" and korys meaning "helmet", referring to the beaked operculum of this species.

Distribution and habitat
Eucalyptus ceratocorys grows in sandy soil in shrubland between Koorda and the southern fringe of the Great Victoria Desert in the southern Wheatbelt and Goldfields-Esperance regions of Western Australia.

Conservation status
This eucalypt is classified as "not threatened" by the Western Australian Government Department of Parks and Wildlife.

See also
List of Eucalyptus species

References

ceratocorys
Mallees (habit)
Myrtales of Australia
Eucalypts of Western Australia
Goldfields-Esperance
Wheatbelt (Western Australia)
Plants described in 1988
Taxa named by William Blakely